Qal'at al-Qatif or Qatif Castle was a historic castle in the city of Qatif, Saudi Arabia. Initial construction of the castle dates back to the third century by the Sassanids. It was then refurbished by the Ottomans and utilized as a defensive military base for the Persian Gulf region. Later, the castle was turned into a civilian-purpose warehouse for the locals. The castle itself was a massive complex of densely populated area and several facilities, including eleven mosques, a keep for the king, keeps for the guests, which are surrounded by the citadel wall. It was oval-shaped, and John Gordon Lorimer estimated that the longest side reaches 365 meters from the east to west, and it reaches 275 meters from the north to south. At its peak, it contained the population of 5,000, and 300 shops. It also equipped moat and farmlands for orchard, connected to nearby Qatif oasis. The castle was destroyed in the 1980s, after the ownership was taken away from the locals, and the buildings and houses were gradually removed. Today, there are only 18 houses left in the field with the rest of the places turned into a public square and parking lots.

Gallery

See also
Tarout Castle
Ajyad Fortress
Qishla of Mecca

References

3rd-century fortifications
Archaeological sites in Saudi Arabia
Ottoman fortifications
Forts in Saudi Arabia
Qatif
Castles in Saudi Arabia
Sasanian castles